Thomas Trevor Finnigan (born 14 October 1952) is an English former professional footballer who made 42 appearances in the Football League playing as a forward for Blackpool and Bournemouth. He started his career with Everton, before successful spells with New Brighton and Runcorn gave him his chance in the Football League. Finnigan returned to non-league football with Yeovil Town in 1979 for a fee of £2,000 after a season with Yeovil he moved to their local rivals Weymouth for a fee of £5,000, before returning to Yeovil as player-manager in 1983.

In 1981, while with Weymouth, Finnigan was twice capped by the England semi-professional side, playing in a 2–0 defeat of Holland and 0–0 draw with Scotland, both of these matches being staged in Italy.

References

1952 births
Living people
People from Bedlington
Footballers from Northumberland
English footballers
England semi-pro international footballers
English football managers
Association football forwards
Everton F.C. players
New Brighton A.F.C. players
Runcorn F.C. Halton players
Blackpool F.C. players
AFC Bournemouth players
Yeovil Town F.C. players
Weymouth F.C. players
English Football League players
Yeovil Town F.C. managers